The Trophées de France, was a domestic championship which took place in France for between 1964 and 1967, for Formula Two cars.

History
Formula Two was the traditionally been regarded as the last major stepping stone for F1 hopefuls - it is typically the last point in a driver's career at which most drivers in the series are aiming at professional careers in racing rather than being amateurs and enthusiasts.

Most notably thing with the Trophées de France, it was domination by one marque, who won three of the four titles. In 1964, 1966 and 1967, these titles were won by drivers using Brabham cars.

Champions

References

 
Auto racing series in France
Formula Two